Crescent Hill Reservoir is a historic site in Crescent Hill, Louisville, Kentucky. It is listed on the National Register of Historic Places. Historic tours and walks have been hosted at the site and it is a popular area for walkers and runners. It is located at the intersection of Reservoir Avenue and 3018 Frankfort Avenue.

The Gothic architecture-style gatehouse building was constructed in 1879. It was designed by water company chief engineer Charles Hermany. The Crescent Hill Filtration Plant opened in 1909 "culminating landmark experiments" in sand and gravel filtration. The site includes historical markers.

See also
 Louisville Water Tower
 Cardinal Hill Reservoir
 List of attractions and events in the Louisville metropolitan area
 National Register of Historic Places listings in Jefferson County, Kentucky

References

19th-century buildings and structures in Louisville, Kentucky
Infrastructure completed in 1879
Reservoirs in Kentucky
National Register of Historic Places in Louisville, Kentucky
Landforms of Louisville, Kentucky
Gothic Revival architecture in Kentucky
Infrastructure in Louisville, Kentucky
Water supply infrastructure on the National Register of Historic Places
1879 establishments in Kentucky